Cube E: Live in Holland is an album by the Residents released on November 8, 1994 by Restless Records as an audio CD.

Although not videotaped in its entirety, the project called The History of American Music in 3 E-Z Pieces was recorded almost in entirety and released as Cube-E: Live in Holland.  The project featured the progression from cowboy songs and slave songs to their ultimate melding into rock and roll.  The first two parts, Buckaroo Blues and Black Barry, had previously been released together on a cassette for UWEB fan club members, while most of the Elvis tracks had appeared on the previous year's The King and Eye.  For space reasons, much of the narration of the last piece is missing.

CD Track listing
 From the Plains to Mexico
 The Theme from Buckaroo Blues
 The Stampede
 The Trail Dance
 Bury Me Not
 Cowboy Waltz
 Saddle Sores
 The Theme from Buckaroo Blues (Reprise)
 The Gospel Truth
Shortnin' Bread
 Black Barry
 Forty-Four
 Engine 44
 New Orleans
 Voodoo Queen
 What Am I Gonna Do
 Organism
 Ober
 The Baby King 1
 Don't Be Cruel
 Devil in Disguise
 Burning Love
 Teddy Bear
 Love Me Tender
 The Baby King 11
 Hound Dog/Out

Legacy 
The music of Cube-E has gone on to influence numerous acts, notably american soundtrack composer Ego Plum, who cites seeing the show as an important moment in his life.

References

The Residents live albums
1994 live albums